The 2020–21 Texas A&M–Corpus Christi Islanders men's basketball team represented Texas A&M University–Corpus Christi in the 2020–21 NCAA Division I men's basketball season. The Islanders, led by tenth-year head coach Willis Wilson, played their home games at American Bank Center, with two games at the Dugan Wellness Center, both of which are in Corpus Christi, Texas, as members of the Southland Conference.

Previous season
The Islanders finished the 2019–20 season 14–18, 10–10 in Southland play to finish in a three-way tie for sixth place. They lost in the first round of the Southland tournament to Northwestern State.

Roster

Schedule and results

|-
!colspan=9 style=| Non-conference Regular season

|-
!colspan=9 style=| Southland Regular season

Source

References

Texas A&M–Corpus Christi Islanders men's basketball seasons
Texas AandM-Corpus Christi Islanders
Texas AandM-Corpus Christi Islanders men's basketball
Texas AandM-Corpus Christi Islanders men's basketball